Jakob De Curtoni was a politician of the late 16th century in Slovenia when the country was under the Holy Roman Empire. He became mayor of Ljubljana in 1588.
He was succeeded by Andreas Falkh in 1592.

References

Mayors of places in the Holy Roman Empire
Mayors of Ljubljana
Year of birth missing
Year of death missing
16th-century Slovenian people